Vexillary  may refer to:
 an adjective meaning "flag-like"
 the carrier of a Roman vexillum
 Vexillary permutation in mathematics